Luigi Conti (30 May 1941 – 30 September 2021) was an Italian prelate of the Catholic Church who was Archbishop of Fermo from 2006 to 2017.

Biography
Luigi Conti was born on 30 May 1941 in Urbania, in the Province of Pesaro, Italy. He studied at the local seminary and the regional seminary in Fano and was ordained a priest on 26 June 1965. He earned his licentiate in theology at the Pontifical Lateran University in 1968. In 1978 he became a priest of the Diocese of Rome.

Pope John Paul II named him Bishop of Macerata-Tolentino-Recanati-Cingoli-Treia on 28 June 1996. He received his episcopal consecration on 21 September.

On 13 April 2006, Pope Benedict XVI appointed him Archbishop of Fermo.

On 3 June 2013, Pope Francis named him Apostolic Administrator of Ascoli Piceno, a position he filled until the installation of Giovanni D’Ercole as the new bishop there on 10 May 2014.

Pope Francis accepted his resignation as Archbishop of Fermo on 14 September 2017.

References

External links
 Catholic Hierarchy: Luigi Conti

1941 births
2021 deaths
Archbishops of Fermo
Pontifical Lateran University alumni
People from Urbino